Fulani braids (also known as Fulani style, Fulani hairstyle) are a type of hair braiding originating among Senegalese woman that can be seen today in various African countries.

History 

Hair styling have played a significant role in the culture of Senegal. It symbolizes origins, social status and marital status. Fulani women throughout Senegalese society used to decorate their styled hair with beads and other accessories.

Fulani braids can be distinguished from other Senegalese hairstyles by two or more long strands braided on each side. Decorative jewelry is then added to the braids.

Many celebrities such Bo Derek, Alicia Keys, and Cicely Tyson have worn the famous Fulani braids.

References 

Senegalese culture
Hairstyles originating in Senegal